The Canton of Nœux-les-Mines is one of the 39 cantons of the Pas-de-Calais department, in northern France. At the French canton reorganisation which came into effect in March 2015, the canton was expanded from 4 to 13 communes.

It consists of the following communes: 

Barlin 
Drouvin-le-Marais
Fouquereuil
Fouquières-lès-Béthune
Gosnay
Haillicourt
Hersin-Coupigny
Hesdigneul-lès-Béthune
Houchin
Labourse
Nœux-les-Mines
Ruitz
Vaudricourt

References

Noeux-les-Mines